Land of The Two Rivers may refer to:

Mesopotamia
"Ardulfurataini", a former national anthem of Iraq